Lord Brand may refer to:
 Robert Brand, 1st Baron Brand (1878–1963), British civil servant and businessman
 David Brand, Lord Brand (1923–1996), Scottish lawyer and judge, Senator of the College of Justice 1972–89